The 1993 AAA Championships was an outdoor track and field competition organised by the Amateur Athletic Association (AAA), held from 16 to 17 July at Alexander Stadium in Birmingham, England. It was considered the de facto national championships for the United Kingdom, ahead of the 1993 UK Athletics Championships.

Medal summary

Men

Women

Notes

 The men's 10,000 metres and women's 3000 metres races took place during the UK Championships on 11 and 12 June 1993 in London.

References

AAA Championships
AAA Championships
Athletics Outdoor
AAA Championships
Sports competitions in Birmingham, West Midlands
Athletics competitions in England